This is a list of films which placed number one at the weekend box office for the year 2019.

Highest-grossing films

See also
 List of Mexican films — Mexican films by year

References

2019
Box
Mexico